Alison Sarah Cupper  (born 20 January 1980) is an Australian politician. She was an Independent member of the Victorian Legislative Assembly from 2018 until 2022, representing the seat of Mildura and was a previous Labor candidate.

Political career
She served on Mildura Rural City Council from 2013, and during that time was twice deputy mayor. She contested the seat of Mildura unsuccessfully in 2010 as the Labor candidate and as an independent in 2014, before winning the seat in 2018, becoming the first woman to hold the seat.

During Cupper's first year in office, she successfully lobbied the Andrews Government to return the privately operated Mildura Base Hospital to public management.

On 4 December 2020, Cupper entered into a coalition agreement with Fiona Patten, leader of the Reason Party. The coalition agreement granted Reason a second representative in the Victorian Parliament, with Cupper being appointed Deputy Leader while retaining her status as an independent member of the Legislative Assembly. Cupper ended the agreement on 13 May 2021.

Personal life
Prior to her entry to the state Parliament, Cupper worked as a social worker and solicitor.

Cupper is married and has one child.

References

1980 births
Living people
Independent members of the Parliament of Victoria
Members of the Victorian Legislative Assembly
Women members of the Victorian Legislative Assembly
Australian solicitors
Victoria (Australia) local councillors
Women local councillors in Australia
21st-century Australian politicians
21st-century Australian women politicians